Gallileo is a 38-storey  skyscraper in the Bahnhofsviertel district of Frankfurt, Germany. It was built from 1999 to 2003.

The towers architecture is made up of two towers linked by a connecting central core. The core is the building's full height. Together with its  floor space, it is the 14th tallest building in the city. Its name is an intentional misspelling of the scientist Galileo's name; the extra l comes from the building's other namesake, the nearby park Gallusanlage. Along with the nearby Silberturm, it served as the corporate headquarters of Dresdner Bank since 2008. A year later, after the takeover of Dresdner Bank by Commerzbank, the new owner planned to use only the Gallileo.

Gallileo has a glass facade with 400 individual windows forming an approximately  large transparent outer skin. In the glass floors were the American artist James Turrell, integrated lighting, which make the building at night from the inside out glowing. These are not architecturally visible. The undersides of the floor slabs serve as reflective surfaces.

Shops, a bar, and the English Theatre Frankfurt are located on the ground floor.

See also
 List of tallest buildings in Frankfurt
 List of tallest buildings in Germany

References

Commercial buildings completed in 2003
Skyscrapers in Frankfurt
Bankenviertel
Skyscraper office buildings in Germany
Commerzbank
Dresdner Bank